Atanas Fidanin (born 9 August 1986) is a Bulgarian footballer who plays as a left back for Sevlievo. He was raised in Levski Sofia's youth teams.

Career
Fidanin started his career at Levski Sofia. After that he played on loan for Rodopa Smolyan and Vidima-Rakovski. In June 2007 he signed with Chernomorets Burgas for fee of 20 000 € from Levski. From July 2009 he was part of the PFC Montana squad. He was released from PFC Montana in June 2011.

Fidanin spent three full seasons at Lokomotiv Gorna Oryahovitsa but left the club in July 2017 when his contract expired.

In July 2017, Fidanin signed with Botev Vratsa.

References

External links
 

1986 births
Living people
People from Gotse Delchev
Bulgarian footballers
First Professional Football League (Bulgaria) players
Second Professional Football League (Bulgaria) players
PFC Rodopa Smolyan players
PFC Vidima-Rakovski Sevlievo players
PFC Chernomorets Burgas players
FC Montana players
PFC Pirin Gotse Delchev players
FC Lokomotiv Gorna Oryahovitsa players
FC Botev Vratsa players
Association football defenders
Sportspeople from Blagoevgrad Province